The Louis XVIII column is a tall column in the Courgain area of Calais to commemorate the visit of king Louis XVIII to the city.

History
After the fall of the empire, Louis XVIII, solicited by a delegation from the town council to return to France via Calais, accepted because "it was the shortest way and he was in a hurry to get back home". The monument set up with his agreement in memory of his landing of 24 April 1814 bears a bronze plaque of the royal foot print and a commemorative text. Declared a historic monument in 1933 the column was removed in 1939 so as not to impede work on the port and was thus saved from destruction. Formed as stone blocks one above the other, it left its former site on the quay to be erected in 1965 at its current spot in the Courgain area of the city.

References

Calais
Monuments and memorials in France
Monumental columns in France
Buildings and structures completed in 1814
1814 establishments in France
Statues in France
19th-century architecture in France